Eupithecia peregovitsi is a moth in the family Geometridae that is endemic to Vietnam.

The forewings are pale brown and the hindwings are white.

References

External links

Moths described in 2009
Endemic fauna of Vietnam
Moths of Asia
peregovitsi